Terror in the Wax Museum is a 1973 American horror mystery film directed by Georg Fenady and starring Ray Milland, Elsa Lanchester, Maurice Evans, John Carradine, Broderick Crawford, Louis Hayward, Patric Knowles, and Shani Wallis. The film was released by Cinerama Releasing Corporation in May 1973. It is set in London at the end of the Victorian era.

Plot
The setting is the 1890s. In the London wax museum of Claude Dupree, known for its collection of famous figures, someone is killing the guests. When Dupree is murdered, Margaret Collins, his niece, decides to continue the family business, which has long attracted the attention of the police. The murder of the wax museum proprietor and some other strange goings-on in the vicinity prompt a police investigator to determine whether the killer is one of the principals who wants to own this piece of property, whether Jack the Ripper has returned to killing after a hiatus of ten years, or whether a wax statue or two has come to life.

Cast
Ray Milland as Harry Flexner
Elsa Lanchester as Julia Hawthorn
Maurice Evans as Inspector Daniels
John Carradine as Claude Dupree
Louis Hayward as Tim Fowley
Patric Knowles as Mr. Southcott
Broderick Crawford as Amos Burns
Shani Wallis as Laurie Mell
Mark Edwards as Sergeant Michael Hawks
Lisa Lu as Madame Yang
Steven Marlo as Karkov
Nicole Shelby as Margaret Collins
Ben Wright as First Constable
Mathilda Calnan as First Charwoman
Peggy Stewart as Second Charwoman
Leslie Thompson as Constable Parker
Don Herbert as Jack the Ripper - Wax Figure
Judy Wetmore as Lizzie Borden - Wax Figure
Jo Williamson as Mrs. Borden - Wax Figure
George Farina as Bluebeard - Wax Figure
Diane Wahrman as Girl in Red - Wax Figure
Rosa Huerta as Lucretia Borgia - Wax Figure
Ben Brown as Attila the Hun - Wax Figure
Rickie Weir as Marie Antoinette - Wax Figure
Paul Wilson as Ivan the Terrible - Wax Figure
Ralph Cunningham as Willie Grossman - Wax Figure
Don Williamson as Constable Henry Bolt - Wax Figure
Evelyn Reynolds as Flower Woman - Wax Figure
Sandy Helberg as Newsboy (uncredited)

References

External links
 
 
 
 

1973 horror films
1970s comedy horror films
1970s thriller films
1970s mystery films
1970s historical comedy films
1970s historical horror films
1973 films
American mystery films
American horror thriller films
Films set in London
Films set in the 1890s
American historical films
Cultural depictions of Jack the Ripper
Cultural depictions of Lizzie Borden
Cultural depictions of Lucrezia Borgia
Cultural depictions of Attila the Hun
Cultural depictions of Marie Antoinette
Cultural depictions of Ivan the Terrible
Cinerama Releasing Corporation films
1973 comedy films
1970s English-language films
Films directed by Georg Fenady
1970s American films